Dog meat is also known as Thịt chó in Vietnamese. The traditional practices of dog meat consumption are seen in some regions of Asia including South Korea, Vietnam, and China.

To illustrate the scale of this practice in Vietnam, according to the FOUR PAWS February 2020 report on dog and cat meat trade in Southeast Asian countries, roughly 5 million dogs are killed for their meat each year. It is important to note that although the figure indicated that Vietnam is the second biggest consumer of dog meat, this practice is common only among a minority of the population

Recent contestation over dog meat consumption in Vietnam has become more frequent. This increased contestation was impacted by animal activists within and outside of Vietnam, by health regulators, and the government, via globalization and expanding market development.

Part of the contestation may be illustrated as the clash of values due to globalization. Dog meat consumption is regarded as a taboo in the West, and such belief is deeply associated with the human-animal relations because dogs were connected to humans as family members.

Dog meat in early history 
There were relatively few English records about the early domestication of dogs in Vietnam. One article published in the International Journal of Osteoarchaeology in 2012 found early evidence of dog domestication in Vietnam that may be traced back to 2100 BC in the Neolithic settlement site of An Son. The site is located close to the northern border of Long An Province in the Southern part of Vietnam. It was suggested that on the site the early inhabitants maintained domestic dogs and pigs. The article also indicated that in northern Vietnam, a few domestic dog remains were found in the site Man Bac. Similar to pig domestication, in the abundance of dog remains in the site, marks of butchery were observed indicating that dogs were sources of food for the inhabitants. More remains of dogs were found in the site than the remains of pigs. There was no evidence of special treatment of dogs such as burial that indicates human-dog emotional ties.

Dog meat and cultural beliefs

Spiritual worship 
The cultural beliefs about dogs are usually connected to the role that dogs played in the household and the emotional connections dogs and human-built. Cultural beliefs also shape the tradition of consuming dog meat.

Dogs are generally used as safeguards for the household. However, they were treated with humble position. The early nineteenth century poem “The Quarrel of the Six Beasts” gave a glimpse of dog's position through its food. In the poem, the animals were arguing about which animal is most useful by comparing their job and the food they eat. Dog in the story claimed that it sometimes gets “crumbs of rice and dregs of soup” from the master, but he often eats low-prestige food such as “rotten taro and wormy yam.” In fact, in the Intage Vietnam's report about pet care, 9% of the populations retained this practice of feeding dogs with leftovers in 2019.

The guarding role of dogs transited into worshiping of them. The Vietnamese believed that placing stone dogs in front of pagodas and houses will drive away ghosts and devils. For example, in Hanoi, dogs were worshiped in the Puppy Temple that may date back to 1010.

The worship of dogs has also been popular among ethnic minorities. The Tay ethnic people would counterbalance the bad Feng Shui in the house by placing a stone dog in the front dog. It is believed that sculptures of the dog process blessings. The stone dogs are also connected to the scared creature nghê, the lion whelp. For Dao ethnic people in the mountain, they have the belief that they were the decedents from a dog god, Panhu. This made dog meat forbidden in their culture.

For other Vietnamese populations, the sacred power of dogs made dog meat a special dish on particular occasions. Eating dog meat after a bad thing meant “kicking” the bad luck away and this contributed to longevity. The dish became a custom in funerals, death anniversaries, and weddings. Dogs were also sacrificed in rituals in the north in order to worship ancestors or to induce rain. Beyond those special occasions, timing for eating dog meat is also associated with strong beliefs. Dog meat is usually consumed by the end of the lunar month or lunar year, eating at the wrong time was believed by Vietnamese to bring the opposite effect of misfortune. This might be associated with one of the Vietnamese folktales that a dog with white fur and nose red as blood is the embodiment of a demon. The demon returned to its original shape in the full moon, which was the time at middle of the lunar month.

Masculinity 
Dog meat was linked to Vietnamese masculinity by its perceived medicinal quality to improve sexual performance. The linkage was also seen in the spaces where dog meat is consumed. Day to day consumption of dog meat in Hoi An, central Vietnam, usually occurs in local liquor shops, Quan Nhau. Some of the Quan Nhau upgraded to “garden” restaurant. While the Quan Nhau was exclusive for male customers only, the latter form of “garden” restaurant also attracts a majority of male customers. There masculine spaces were where men recharge and boost their masculinity and display and perform it with the female staff who provided sexual services.

This connection can also be analyzed in the framework of Confucianism. Confucianism has profound influence in defining the proper genders roles in Vietnam, in which males go out and socialize in dog meat restaurants while women remain inferior and remain in the domestic space. Additionally, dog-consuming practices can be seen in many east Asian Nations which was influenced by Confucianism. Dog meat was also nicknamed as “Confucius meat” because Confucius himself enjoyed dog meat. Beyond Vietnam, in South Korea, people tried to escape from the social pressure from the moral values of Confucianism by consuming dog meat.

Political affiliation 
According to Confucianism values, an ideal man should be educated, knowledgeable and politically involved. This is when dog eating, a popular practice in Confucian society, converged with the interest of political engagement. The dog meat tradition persisted as a way of participation or rejecting the dominant political ideology. Through conducted interviews with the Vietnamese it was explained that as many of the new middle class benefited from the contact of the ruling elite and the government, they are “obligated to express loyalty and commitment” toward the Northern regime through accepting a new culinary practice from the north and rejects the local moral standards. This is closely related to the Confucian ideas of obedience and loyalty in the social hierarchy.

Of course, this transforming culinary practice is not always welcomed without doubts. While Vietnamese enjoyed dog meat dishes, they are acutely aware of the problems associated with violence, crime, drunkenness, and illicit sex which made the practices immoral and shameful among the Vietnamese community. Furthermore, showing loyalty by incorporating the dining practice of the north regime didn't indicate that the middle class fully supported the regime.

Dog meat and transitions

Increased appetite for wild meat 
After recovering from Asian Financial Crises from 1997, 2004 was a point which the Vietnamese economy returned to rapid growth, with the continued influx of foreign direct investment.

In reality, however, the appetite for dog and exotic meat increased together with the expansion of the general meat consumption. This trend corresponded with the rising popularity of dog meat restaurants in Hoi An. First, the number of dog meat restaurants increased. By 1999, only a couple of places served dog meat, but by 2004 there are “dozens of eating venues throughout the town.” Second, the visibility of those restaurant increased. As for 1999, it was mentioned that, dog meat restaurants were rather “in the maze of alleys” or “outside the town.” In addition, instead of writing “Thit Cho” on the sign, a more obscure expression “Thit Cay” was used. In 2004, more restaurants are visible with the name “Thit Cho.”

There was an interconnection between dog meat consumption and wild meat consumption, both view as exotic. The increase of appetite for wild meat is also tied with market development connected to the bonds of business partnerships.

While rich people may show their high social status by serving expensive types of wild meat, others served expensive wild meat to the guest as means of showing respect for business cooperation. This form of “diplomacy” then connects to the likelihood of success in the business partnership. In this way, wild meat consumption actually constructed a social norm tangled with business culture and partnership.

A similar type of social protocol of showing respect is seen in South Korean dog meat consumption, in which one tried to impress and show respect to a prestigious guest by offering the meat of one's own pet dog.

Expanding pet market 

Counter arguing the case of capitalist development and the increase in the demand of dog meat, it is shown that capitalism also brought in the demand of dog not as a source of food but as a source of companionship.

In the book chapter “An Appetite for Dogs: Consuming and loving Them in Vietnam” Dr. Anthony, a scientist for animal behavior and human-animal interaction in Australia, claimed that capitalist development also brought about breakthroughs in dog eating traditions.

With the first opening of a commercial pet shop in Ho Chi Minh City in 2006, within 8 years, the shops expanded in numbers and availability in different cities. Furthermore, luxurious grooming service was offered to pet owners in the cities.

Being family-based labor of love, Vietnamese pet retailers ran a cash-based business which makes analysis on the industry harder. Although not so much scholarly analysis has focused on the potential influence of expanding pet care industry on the dog consumption tradition, there is enough evidence to indicate that the market is on the rise.

This change might be brought by the increasingly important concept of companion animals. In fact, in the article of Rosen a New York-based journalist, “To Eat Dog, or Not to Eat Dog. What Vietnam’s popular imitation-canine dish says about how food taboos change”, interview conducted with the clinic owner in Vietnam is showing the pet owners’ increased willingness to spend more money on their pets.

Capitalist developments was giving people more economic capacity and would also lead to an increase in the interaction with pets, strengthening the human-animal relations. Statistic provided by Dr. Anthony suggested that some part of the population in the south are supportive toward a ban on the consumption of dog meat. The practice of refusing to eat dog meat as a pet owner is also frequently observed.

Legal status 

Connecting to the previous section, Vietnamese pet owners together with activists from other nations are advocating for legalizing the ban of dog meat. The SoiDog foundation is collecting 1.5 million signatures for a petition of dog meat ban to the Communist Party of Vietnam. In the letter, China's progress on forbidding the trade of cat, dog and wildlife meat was mentioned. Besides emotional appeals, public health concerns over diseases and the nation's image of a civilized and modernized nation were being highlighted.

In French Indochina, the slaughtering and eating of dog meat was once banned in the late 19th century. However, dog meat had returned to the table since the French left.

The current legislation provided pet owner some protection over pet theft. In July 2016, a law was amended to enable prosecutions against thieves whose crimes cause social disorder.

The amendment meant that the theft of even a single dog could result in a jail sentence. For years, criminals had stolen dogs from homes with near immunity as the dogs were considered to have too little financial value to bring a prosecution.

More recently, in 2018, a statement was issued by the director of Hanoi Department of Animal Health stating that raising public awareness of the risks of dog meat consumption needed to be strengthened to discourage the consumption of dog meat, and that the dog meat trade would be eliminated from the city's central 21 districts by 2021. In 2019, the Food Safety Management Board in Ho Chi Minh City urged people to stop consuming dog meat. Yet, there wasn't any law issue to ban the dog meat trade.

Controversy and debate 
The consumption of dog meat and exotic meat has been condemned by the West as being "backward” and “archaic.” Animal rights have become an increasingly important parameter in assessing a nation's development and progress. To further explain, a well-developed, civilized nation is expected to prohibit forms of animal abuse such as consumption of dog and wild meat. It is also interpreted by many activists that with the process of globalization and economic development, Asian countries should adopt to this “global” standard. For example, NGOs such as four paws promoted that the globalized developments such as transnational tourism has given pressure for a shift of the tradition in Vietnam. There is also hope that Asians who received western education will foster changes in Vietnam.
In the case of Vietnam War, over 5000 dogs were brought to Vietnam to serve as guard dogs for Americans. Statistics show that less than 200 dogs were able to make their way back to the United States. Working dogs were largely abandoned and considered to be “surplus equipment.”

References 

Dog meat
Vietnamese cuisine